The SLOCAT Partnership on sustainable, low carbon transport is an international, multi-stakeholder ecosystem of over 90 entities across transport sectors associations, knowledge and academia, governments, multilateral organisations, NGOs, philanthropy and industry. With a primary focus on land transport, and a geographic footprint targeted at the Global South; we deliver on our mission through 3 mutually-reinforcing work streams; namely knowledge and policy analysis; advocacy and engagement, and dialogue and networking. SLOCAT's mission is "To enable collaborative knowledge and action for sustainable, low carbon transport and bring the voice of the movement into international climate change and sustainability processes."

SLOCAT partnership

SLOCAT was established in 2009 by the pioneers of our movement as an outcome of the Bellagio Process and since then has been served by a full-time professional secretariat. In 2014, SLOCAT acquired legal personality through the incorporation of SLOCAT Foundation into Dutch law. The partnership represents UN organizations, multilateral and bilateral development organizations, NGOs and foundations, academe and the business sector.

SLOCAT's work
SLOCAT claims to be a thought leader in comprehensive synthesis of knowledge products to support advocacy on sustainable, low-carbon transport. With a primary focus on both motorised and non-motorised land transport and mobility, and a geographical footprint targeting developing countries, SLOCAT fulfils its mission through 3 main work streams: Knowledge and Policy Analysis, Advocacy and Engagement, and Dialogue and Networking.

References

Sustainable transport
Organisations based in the Netherlands
2009 establishments in the Netherlands